Prodrive may refer to:

 Prodrive, a motorsport and automotive engineering group based in Banbury, Oxfordshire, England
 Prodrive F1, a proposed Formula One team run by Prodrive Ltd
 Prodrive P2, a prototype two-seater sports car designed, engineered and built by Prodrive Ltd
 Tickford Racing, an Australian Supercar team formerly known as Prodrive Racing Australia